Uttur is a small village in Mudhol, district Bagalkot, Karnataka, India.

References

Villages in Bagalkot district